Vojtěch Mynář (4 May 1944 – 11 July 2018) was a Czech politician, who from 2012 until 2014, was a Member of the European Parliament, representing the Czech Republic. He was a member of the Social Democratic Party.

References

1944 births
2018 deaths
People from Petřvald (Karviná District)
Communist Party of Czechoslovakia politicians
Czech Social Democratic Party MEPs
MEPs for the Czech Republic 2009–2014